Samuel Schallinger (died 1942) was an Austrian Jewish businessman.

Biography
Schallinger was an Austrian Jewish businessman who was co-owner of the Imperial and the Bristol hotels in Vienna, Austria, which today are still among the city of Vienna's grandest hotels.

In 1938, the hotels underwent Aryanization and he was forced to sell his shares. He and his family were deported to Theresienstadt concentration camp near Prague, Czechoslovakia where they all died in 1942.

Details of the property seized from Schallinger and other Austrian Jews under the Nazis, and 
names the famous beneficiaries who took them and never gave them back, are outlined in the book Unser Wien (Our Vienna) by Stephan Templ and Tina Walzer.

References

Further reading
 Andreas Augustin, Bill Lorenz, Hotel Bristol, Vienna, The Most Famous Hotels In the World (2001)

1942 deaths
Austrian people who died in the Theresienstadt Ghetto
Austrian hoteliers
20th-century Austrian businesspeople
Jewish Austrian history
Jews who died in the Holocaust